Blazing or blazin' can refer to;

 Trail blazing, practice of marking outdoor pathways.
 A technique for changing the energy distribution of dispersed light from a diffraction grating by altering the shape of the slits.
 A slang term for smoking cannabis
 Blazing, a 2011 album by  Jenny Wilson
 "Blazin" (song), a 2010 song by Nicki Minaj
 "Blazin", a song by Alison Hinds from the album Soca Queen, 2007
 "Blazin", a song by In This Moment from the album A Star-Crossed Wasteland, 2010
 "Blazin", a 2004 song by MC Tali
 "Blazin", a 2007 song by Bliss n Eso
 "Blazin", a 2007 song by Ghislain Poirier